Eduardo Angulo (born Bilbao, 1958) is a Spanish writer and professor of cellular biology at the Universidad del País Vasco. He has published widely in scientific journals and other academic publications; he is also a contributor to the Enciclopedia Durvan. He is a member of the Círculo Escéptico, and maintains a biology blog on the online edition of El Correo de Bilbao. Among his books are El animal que cocina. Gastronomía para homínidos (2009), Monstruos. Una visión científica de la Criptozoología (2007), and Julio Verne y la cocina. La vuelta al mundo en 80 recetas (2005).

References

Spanish biologists
1958 births
Living people
Academic staff of the University of the Basque Country